Oligoryzomys stramineus, also known as the straw-colored colilargo or straw-colored pygmy rice rat, is a species of rodent in the genus Oligoryzomys of the family Cricetidae. It occurs only in the cerrado and caatinga ecoregions of northeastern Brazil. Its karyotype has 2n = 52 and FNa = 68-70.

Description
Oligoryzomys stramineus is a large species of colilargo with a yellowish-brown head and dorsal surface and whitish underparts, with a sharp line demarcating the boundary between the two. It has long incisive foramina (openings in the hard palate of the skull) and broad zygomatic plates (bony plates in the upper jaw). The head-and-body length averages  while the tail averages .

Distribution and habitat
This species is native to South America where it occurs in northeastern and central Brazil. Its range extends from the cerrado ecoregion of the states of northern Goiás and northern Minas Gerais southward to the caatinga ecoregion of the states of Paraíba and Pernambuco. In the cerrado, it has mainly been found in gallery forests. It shares part of its range in central Brazil with Oligoryzomys fornesi and is sometimes caught in the same line of traps. It is also sympatric with Oligoryzomys nigripes, but the two species are not found in the same trap-lines.

Ecology
Little is known of the breeding habits of O. stramineus; a pregnant female carrying four young was caught in September; and a juvenile was caught in August suggesting that mating may have occurred in June or July.

Status
O. stramineus has a wide range, and though its total population is not known, it is considered to be common and its population stable. No particular threats have been identified and the International Union for Conservation of Nature has rated its conservation status as being of "least concern".

References

Literature cited
Duff, A. and Lawson, A. 2004. Mammals of the World: A checklist. New Haven: A & C Black. . 

Weksler, M. and Bonvicino, C. 2008. . In IUCN. IUCN Red List of Threatened Species. Version 2009.2. <www.iucnredlist.org>. Downloaded on September 5, 2015.

Oligoryzomys
Mammals described in 1998
Fauna of the Cerrado
Taxa named by Marcelo Weksler